Sir Robert Denny (died 1419), of London and Barham in Linton, Cambridgeshire, was an English politician.

Family
Denny came from a family of fishmongers. His father was  Geoffrey Denny (who died in 1375), a London fishmonger. His mother was Geoffrey's first wife, Cecily née Waltham, also from a family of fishmongers. By 1384, Robert Denny had married Amy or Anne, who died after him, dying c. 1423). She had previously been married to John Furneaux of Middle Harling, Norfolk and Barham. Denny and his wife had one son.

Career
Denny was knighted at some point before March 1387. He was a Member (MP) of the Parliament of England for Cambridgeshire in 1391 and 1393.

References

14th-century births
1419 deaths
English MPs 1391
People from Linton, Cambridgeshire
English MPs 1393
Fishmongers (people)